Mercury iodide may refer to:

Mercury(I) iodide, Hg2I2
Mercury(II) iodide, HgI2
Mercury (element)